Daorson (Ancient Greek: Δαορσών) was the capital of the Illyrian tribe of the Daorsi (Ancient Greek Δαόριζοι, Δαούρσιοι; Latin Daorsei). The Daorsi lived in the valley of the Neretva River between 300 BC and 50 BC. They came very early into contact with Greek traders acquiring many facies of Greek civilization, and the town  acquired a certain degree of Hellenization. After the peace treaty with Rome in 168/167 BC, the Daorsi minted their own coins.

The ruins of Daorson is located at Ošanići, near Stolac, Bosnia and Herzegovina.

History

Daorson was built around a central fort or acropolis, surrounded by cyclopean walls made of huge stone blocks (similar to those in Mycenae, in Greece). The acropolis would have housed all of the important administrative, public and religious buildings. The defensive wall extending from southwest to northeast was 65 metres long, 4.2 metres wide, and from 4.5 to 7.5 metres high with doors and towers on both sides.

The remnants of numerous wine amphorae have been found, including some ceramic fragments. The most valuable of the finds is a bronze helmet decorated with a series of mythological figures. The inscription on it is similar to the inscription on a helmet found in North Macedonia. The remnants of a granite sculpture of Cadmus and Harmonia have also been found. This piece includes an Illyrian relief with thirteen snakes and five pairs of eagle's wings. A small building housed a mint facility.  Thirty-nine different coins were discovered in this building, the majority (29) depicted King Ballaios, who ruled after 168 BC. Money was of immense importance to the Daorsi, allowing the tribe to remain independent while securing their business, cultural and trade links with other groups.

After the Daorsi were attacked by the Delmatae, they joined Issa in seeking the protection of the Roman state.  The Daorsi abandoned Caravantius and fought on the side of the Romans, contributing with their strong navy.  After the Illyrian Wars the Romans gave the Daorsi immunity.

Site description

Ošanići consist of three linked stones groups, the disposition of which is dictated by the lie of the land.

The central area is occupied by a dominant hill fort or acropolis below and to the south and south-west of which are terraces on the ridge, while to the east, on the Banje plateau, is the outer-acropolis area of residential and commercial, mainly artisanal and trade quarters of the settlement.

The hill fort was built on a prehistoric fortified settlement which had been in existence there since the early (17/16th century BCE) to the end of the late Bronze Age (9/8th century BCE). The date of the ransacking of the town of Daorson that finally put an end to human settlement there can be determined with fair accuracy as the mid or second half of the 1st century BCE from the details of the wars waged by the Roman Praetor Vatinius against the Delmati. No permanent settlement ever arose on the ruins of the town of Daors. There is ample evidence of its advanced culture and civilization: it minted its own coins and produced complex artistically decorated buckles, there is graffiti on shards of pottery vessels, and parts of stone statues of human figures some 2 m in height were found.

A megalithic wall, erected following the lie of the land, has been dated to the 4th century BCE, when both towers were probably built following the construction of the wall. The rest of the acropolis is of later date, through to the 1st century BCE. 
One of the most important finds is a helmet with the Greek inscription ΠΙИ, probably the abbreviated Illyrian name of the owner PINNES; it was probably made in the 3rd century BCE.

Protection
Daorson is designated National monument of Bosnia and Herzegovina, and, including the nearby Radimlja necropolis, and other individual sites outside the city of Stolac perimeter, is designated as The natural and architectural ensemble of Stolac and proposed for inscription into the UNESCO's World Heritage Site list. The bid for inscription is currently placed on the UNESCO Tentative list.

See also 
List of ancient Illyrian cities
List of ancient Illyrians
Neretva

References

Bibliography

External links

Illyria and Illyrians

Ancient Bosnia and Herzegovina
Ancient tribes in Bosnia and Herzegovina
Illyrian archeological sites and structures in Bosnia and Herzegovina
Illyrian Bosnia and Herzegovina
Archaeology of Illyria
Illyrian architecture
Illyrian art
Cities in ancient Illyria
National Monuments of Bosnia and Herzegovina
Former populated places in the Balkans
Stolac
Megalithic monuments in Europe